Jiaoling Prison is a prison in Meizhou City, Guangdong Province, China. Jiaoling Prison was established in 1963. Industrial production takes place in this prison.

See also

Other prisons in Guangdong:

 Jiangmen Prison
 Gaoming Prison
 Panyu Prison
 Foshan Prison
 Lianping Prison

References

External links 

Official site of the Guangdong Prison Administrative Bureau - Jiaoling Prison (as Meizhou Prison, 梅州监狱)

Prisons in Guangdong
Buildings and structures in Meizhou